"When You Come Back Down" was the debut single by progressive bluegrass band Nickel Creek from their self titled debut album. The song is a cover of the bluegrass musician Tim O'Brien's original version. The song was written by Danny O'Keefe and Tim O'Brien.

Music video
Sara Watkins described the making of the music video in 2000:

Chart performance

Personnel
Chris Thile - Mandolin, Lead Vocals
Sean Watkins - Guitar, Harmony Vocals
Sara Watkins - Violin, Harmony Vocals
Scott Thile - Acoustic Bass

References

External links
Music video at the CMT website

Nickel Creek songs
2001 debut singles
Songs written by Danny O'Keefe
1999 songs